The UPND Youth League is a youth organization of the United Party for National Development, a  political party in Zambia.

Formation
The Youth League was formed to help mobilise youths towards, the values, beliefs and principles of the UPND, the governing political party in Zambia.

The Youth League was formed by the youth members of the party to spearhead the issues faced by young people in Zambia. Among them was the 4-month closure of the Copperbelt University which the Zambian Education minister had closed following student protests.

References

Political organisations based in Zambia